The Shiretoko-class patrol vessel is a class of PL type patrol vessels of the Japan Coast Guard (JCG; former Maritime Safety Agency, MSA). PL stands for "Patrol vessel Large", and the class name "Shiretoko" is named after Shiretoko, the northeastern area of the island of Hokkaidō, Japan

Background 
In 1977, Act on Territorial Waters and Contiguous Water Area and the Act on Temporary Measures Concerning Fishery Waters was confirmed by the National Diet of Japan to adapt for the UNCLOS III. As a direct result of these acts, the coverage area of the MSA was dramatically extended, so the update of their equipment became an urgent issue. In consequence of these situations, the MSA had put some series of patrol vessels into commission from late 1970s to early 1980s. This class was one of these series, planned to form the main fleet in the high-endurance mission.

Design 
This class was designed as the enlarged and mass-production variant of the Daiou class, preceding large patrol vessels. Like the Daiou-class, the hull is ice resistant, but the hull structure has been further strengthened by increasing the thickness of the ice belt and the number of ribs.

As designed, it was to be equipped with one Bofors 40 mm L/60 gun and one Oerlikon 20 mm cannon; latter-batch vessels had their weapon changed to the newer Oerlikon KDC 35 mm gun, and the obsolete 20mm machine gun was dropped. And later, ships of the early-batch had their weapon converted to the JM61-M 20 mm gun.

Ships in the class

References

Bibliography

See also
 List of Japan Coast Guard vessels and aircraft

Patrol vessels of the Japan Coast Guard
Patrol ship classes